Papy is a 2009 film directed by Djo Tunda Wa Munga. It was released on 27 July 2009 at the Zanzibar Film Festival.

Plot 
Papy finds out he has AIDS. His wife and family reject him, he can no longer go to work and he has to take care of his children. To be able to obtain the antiretrovirals, a member of his family must accompany him, but he has no one. Desperate, he hires a homeless man to play the role of his uncle. Papy gets his medicines.

External links 

 

2009 films
Belgian drama films
Democratic Republic of the Congo drama films
French drama films
Creative Commons-licensed films
2000s French films